Tia Lynn Ballard (born May 11, 1986) is an American voice actress and ADR director affiliated with Funimation and Sentai Filmworks. Some of her notable roles are Kusano in Sekirei, Mizore Shirayuki in Rosario + Vampire, Rin Ogata in Rideback, Happy in Fairy Tail, Eris in Cat Planet Cuties, Nanami Momozono in Kamisama Kiss, Kokomi Teruhashi in The Disastrous Life of Saiki K., Zero Two in Darling in the Franxx, Itsuki Nakano in The Quintessential Quintuplets and Yashiro Nene in Toilet-Bound Hanako-kun.

Biography
Ballard was born and grew up in Paris, Texas. She developed an interest in voice acting when she attended a local anime convention, seeing the panel of voice actors, and learned that Funimation was only two hours from her hometown. While attending Paris Junior College, she was a participant in the Disney College Program, after which she changed her major to theatre. Ballard graduated in 2006 with an associate degree in theatre and art.

Ballard's first voice acting gig was at Funimation where she worked with Monica Rial. She played Young Asim in Dragonaut: The Resonance. She later had a larger role as Rachel Calvin in Linebarrels of Iron.

Outside of voice acting, Ballard has co-created a Super Mario Bros.-themed online comic called Koopasta.

Filmography

Anime

Film

Video games

References

  – podcast interview with Tia Ballard posted January 7, 2012.

External links
  
 
 

1986 births
Living people
American video game actresses
American voice actresses
Texas A&M University–Commerce alumni
People from Paris, Texas
Actresses from Texas
21st-century American actresses